Paulo António Alves (22 October 1969 – 17 August 2021), commonly known as Paulão, was an Angolan footballer who played as a midfielder.

Club career
Born in Luanda, Paulão arrived in Portugal in 1994, where he would spend the following eight years of his career, joining Vitória F.C. from Estrela Clube Primeiro de Maio. After one season he signed for Primeira Liga club S.L. Benfica, appearing in 18 games in his first year and scoring three goals as the team finished second 11 points behind FC Porto.

Paulão was only a fringe player in his second season with Benfica, playing in only seven official matches. He then left for fellow top-division side Académica de Coimbra, where he was also featured sparingly.

Subsequently, Paulão spent four years in the second division with S.C. Espinho, after which he returned to his homeland to play with Atlético Petróleos Luanda and Atlético Sport Aviação, retiring in 2004 at the age of nearly 35.

International career
Paulão played for Angola for eight years, his debut coming in 1993. He was a member of the squad that appeared at the 1996 African Cup of Nations in South Africa, netting in a 3–3 draw against Cameroon in an eventual group stage exit.

During his tenure with the national team, Paulão appeared in eight FIFA World Cup qualification games, winning five of those. Additionally, he also played at the Europe XI v Africa XI friendly game in 1997.

International goals
Scores and results list Angola's goal tally first, score column indicates score after each goal.

Death
Paulão died on 17 August 2021 in Luanda, at the age of 51.

References

External links

1969 births
2021 deaths
Footballers from Luanda
Angolan footballers
Association football midfielders
Girabola players
Atlético Petróleos de Luanda players
Atlético Sport Aviação players
Primeira Liga players
Liga Portugal 2 players
Vitória F.C. players
S.L. Benfica footballers
Associação Académica de Coimbra – O.A.F. players
S.C. Espinho players
Angola international footballers
1996 African Cup of Nations players
1998 African Cup of Nations players
Angolan expatriate footballers
Expatriate footballers in Portugal
Angolan expatriate sportspeople in Portugal